J. Williams Beal, Sons, successor to the office of J. Williams Beal, was a successful architectural firm based in Boston, Massachusetts. Established in 1920 by the sons of the late architect Beal, it remained in business into the 1980s.

History
In 1888, J. Williams Beal established what became a successful architectural practice in Boston. He had three sons, the elder two of which came to work for him. These were John W. Beal and Horatio W. Beal. A third son, Robert Washburn Beal, was a landscape architect.

The firm of J. Williams Beal, Sons was established in early 1920, following the death of J. Williams Beal. The Beal brothers were the sole partners until 1960, when they added H. Story Granger and Raymond W. Dyer, as which point the firm became known as J. Williams Beal, Sons, Granger & Dyer. After Dyer's departure a new partner, Edward A. J. Poskus, was added. Horatio Williams Beal died in 1964. J. Williams Beal, Sons, Granger & Poskus was dissolved upon the death of Granger in 1969. John Woodbridge Beal died in 1971, after which Poskus managed the firm alone. J. Williams Beal, Sons & Poskus lasted at least until the mid-1980s.

Partners
John Woodbridge Beal was born on July 11, 1887, in Hanover, Massachusetts. Beal worked in his father's office for a number of years, until his father's death in 1919. At this point he established the firm of J. Williams Beal, Sons with his brother, Horatio. After Horatio's death in 1964, Beal managed the firm with H. Story Granger and Edward A. J. Poskus. He was active until the firm until his death in 1971.

Horatio Williams Beal was born on September 1, 1889, in Hanover, Massachusetts. He graduated from Harvard University in 1911, and earned a master's degree from the school of architecture in 1915. After his graduation he entered the office of his father, J. Williams Beal. In 1917 he enlisted in the U. S. Navy for service in World War I. In 1919 he returned to Boston, and went back to work in his father's office. Upon his father's death, he and his brother established J. Williams Beal, Sons. Beal remained active in the firm until his death in 1964.

Harold Story Granger attended Columbia University, graduating in 1912. He worked for Nelson & Van Wagener in New York, before embarking on an architectural career in Albany, New York. He later worked in New Haven, Connecticut for the architectural firm of Davis & Walldorff. There he served as the vice-president of the Connecticut chapter of the American Institute of Architects. He later moved to Boston, where he became associated with the firm of J. Williams Beal, Sons. In 1960 he and Raymond W. Dyer became partners in the firm, which became known as J. Williams Beal, Sons, Granger & Dyer. Dyer soon withdrew, and the firm was briefly known as J. Williams Beal, Sons & Granger, after which Edward J. A. Poskus became a partner. J. Williams Beal, Sons, Granger & Poskus was dissolved after Granger's death in 1969.

Raymond Wallace Dyer was born circa 1918 in Portsmouth, New Hampshire. He attended the University of New Hampshire, class of 1941, after a public school education. He came to Massachusetts around 1947, settling in Hingham, after service in World War II. He entered the Beal office at an unknown date, but was experienced enough to be made a partner alongside H. Story Granger in 1960. His time at the firm of J. Williams Beal, Sons, Granger & Dyer was brief, as he left to practice on his own in Hingham. He died in 1976.

Edward Alphonse John Poskus was born on January 21, 1921. Like Dyer, he fought in WWII. He joined the Beals at an unknown date, but held a position of high responsibility by 1959. In 1962, after the departure of Raymond W. Dyer, he became a partner in J. Williams Beal, Sons, Granger & Poskus. Upon Granger's death, Poskus was the sole partner of what became J. Williams Beal, Sons & Poskus. In 1980, he relocated the office to Brockton. He retired a few years afterward, and served as building inspector for the town of Ipswich. He died in 2007.

Architectural works

J. Williams Beal, Sons, 1920-1960
 1922 - Dean Emery House, 18 Quissett Harbor Rd, Falmouth, Massachusetts
 1924 - Elks Building, 1218 Hancock St, Quincy, Massachusetts
 1924 - Hyannis Trust Company Building, 307 Main St, Hyannis, Massachusetts
 Demolished.
 1924 - Lowell Cooperative Bank Building, 18 Hurd St, Lowell, Massachusetts
 1924 - Masonic Temple, 357 Main St, Hyannis, Massachusetts
 1925 - Barnstable High School, 120 High School Rd, Hyannis, Massachusetts
 Presently St. John Paul II High School.
 1925 - Repertory Theatre of Boston, 264 Huntington Ave, Boston, Massachusetts
 Now the Boston University Theatre.
 1925 - Rockport High School (former), 4 Broadway, Rockport, Massachusetts
 1926 - Baptist Temple, 205 S Main St, Fall River, Massachusetts
 1926 - Barnstable Town Hall, 397 Main St, Hyannis, Massachusetts
 Now the John F. Kennedy Hyannis Museum.
 1926 - Masonic Temple, 1170 Hancock St, Quincy, Massachusetts
 1926 - Nurses' Home, Plymouth County Hospital, High St, Hanson, Massachusetts
 1926 - Peoples Savings Bank Building, 181 Main St, Marlborough, Massachusetts
 1927 - Bethany Congregational Church, 10 Spear St, Quincy, Massachusetts
 1927 - Leroy Clark House, 503 Sippewissett Rd, Falmouth, Massachusetts
 1927 - Edmund Q. Sylvester School, 495 Hanover St, Hanover, Massachusetts
 1927 - Whitman High School, 20 Essex St, Whitman, Massachusetts
 Demolished in 2007.
 1928 - Athol Savings Bank Building, 444 Main St, Athol, Massachusetts
 1928 - Barbara Keith Memorial Ward for Children, Brockton Hospital, 680 Centre St, Brockton, Massachusetts
 1928 - First National Bank Building, 1 King St, Northampton, Massachusetts
 1928 - Rockland High School, 100 Taunton Ave, Rockland, Massachusetts
 Demolished.
 1929 - Granite Trust Company Building, 1400 Hancock St, Quincy, Massachusetts
 1929 - Guay's System Bakeries Building, 1455 Hancock St, Quincy, Massachusetts
 1930 - Abington Savings Bank Building, 533 Washington St, Abington, Massachusetts
 1930 - Norfolk County Bank Building, 1319 Beacon St, Brookline, Massachusetts
 1931 - Abington Mutual Fire Insurance Company Building, 536 Washington St, Abington, Massachusetts
 1931 - Melrose High School (former), 350 Lynn Fells Pkwy, Melrose, Massachusetts
 Demolished in 2005.
 1932 - Dyer Memorial Library, 30 Centre Ave, Abington, Massachusetts
 1932 - U. S. Post Office, 39 Webster St, Rockland, Massachusetts
 1935 - Abington High School (former), 1071 Washington St, Abington, Massachusetts
 1935 - Central Fire Station, 6 Taylor St, Saugus, Massachusetts
 1935 - Enterprise Department Store, 203-217 Main St, Brockton, Massachusetts
 1935 - Franklin School, 169 N Franklin St, Holbrook, Massachusetts
 1936 - Norwell High School (former), 322 Main St, Norwell, Massachusetts
 1937 - Hunnewell Elementary School, 28 Cameron St, Wellesley, Massachusetts
 1938 - Burlington High School (former), 61 Center St, Burlington, Massachusetts
 1939 - Northampton High School, 380 Elm St, Northampton, Massachusetts
 1943 - South Shore Hospital, 55 Fogg Rd, Weymouth, Massachusetts
 1945 - Williams Intermediate School, 200 South St, Bridgewater, Massachusetts
 1947 - Chatham Elementary School, 147 Depot Rd, Chatham, Massachusetts
 1949 - Ella F. Osborn Elementary School, 345 Main St, Norwell, Massachusetts
 1949 - Woodland Hall, Lasell College, Newton, Massachusetts
 1950 - Cold Spring Elementary School, 25 Alden St, Plymouth, Massachusetts
 1950 - Middleborough High School, 71 E Grove St, Middleborough, Massachusetts
 1953 - Deer Hill School, 208 Sohier St, Cohasset, Massachusetts
 1954 - West Junior High School, 271 West St, Brockton, Massachusetts
 1956 - East Junior High School, 464 Centre St, Brockton, Massachusetts
 1957 - Rockland Senior High School, 52 MacKinlay Way, Rockland, Massachusetts

J. Williams Beal, Sons, Granger & Dyer, 1960-1962
 1961 - Franklin High School (former), 224 Oak St, Franklin, Massachusetts
 1961 - Edmund Q. Sylvester School (addition), 495 Hanover St, Hanover, Massachusetts

J. Williams Beal, Sons, Granger & Poskus, 1962-1969
 1963 - Girls' Camp Building, Morgan Memorial Fresh Air Camp, Athol, Massachusetts
 1965 - Fox Hill Elementary School, 196 Fox Hill Rd, Burlington, Massachusetts
 1967 - Mansfield High School, 250 East St, Mansfield, Massachusetts
 1969 - Rupert A. Nock Middle School, 70 Low St, Newburyport, Massachusetts

J. Williams Beal, Sons & Poskus, 1969-1980s
 1971 - Paul F. Doyon Memorial School, 216 Linebrook Rd, Ipswich, Massachusetts
 1974 - South Shore Vocational Technical High School (addition), 476 Webster St, Hanover, Massachusetts
 1982 - Northbridge Elementary School (addition), 30 Cross St, Whitinsville, Massachusetts

References

1920 establishments in Massachusetts
1980s disestablishments in Massachusetts
Defunct architecture firms based in Massachusetts
Companies based in Boston
Architects from Boston
Design companies established in 1920
Design companies disestablished in the 20th century
1920s in Boston
1980s in Boston